Ezra Bridger is a fictional character in the Star Wars franchise, voiced by Taylor Gray. He is featured as the protagonist of the animated series Star Wars Rebels (2014–2018) and appears in related works. Ezra also appears in Star Wars Forces of Destiny (2018) with Gray reprising his role. The character will make his live-action debut in the television series Ahsoka, portrayed by Eman Esfandi.

In the Star Wars universe, Ezra is an orphaned street urchin and con artist who joins the Ghost crew in freeing his home planet of Lothal from the tyranny of the Galactic Empire and is taken under the wing of Kanan Jarrus, who trains him in the Jedi arts. Later, Ezra and the crew join the Rebel Alliance to assist them in their fight to free the galaxy as a whole, and face enemies such as the Inquisitors, Darth Vader, and Grand Admiral Thrawn—the latter of whom Ezra sacrifices himself to defeat, disappearing along with him in the Unknown Regions of the galaxy.

Creation and development

Concept
Executive producer Dave Filoni describes the character as a "con artist". Creative executive Rayne Roberts said: "[Ezra] doesn't really trust anyone; that [is] his motto. He has that kind of hard edge at times but knows how to turn on the charm when it comes to getting what he wants and [is] very charismatic — [one] would want to be his friend." The episode "Empire Day" reveals that Ezra was born on the same day the Galactic Empire was inaugurated, and that he has been living on his own since he was seven, after his parents, Ephraim and Mira Bridger, were arrested for speaking out against the Empire. According to Taylor Gray, Ezra lives alone in the streets of Lothal, relying on his "street smarts" – as well as subconscious Force abilities – to survive.

Voice acting
The character is voiced by Taylor Gray. On his character, Gray stated: "He's a pickpocket, he's a little thief. But he's doing it all because he needs to survive." Executive producer Greg Weisman said: "We see this whole series very much through Ezra's eyes. As his eyes get opened to what the Empire's capable of, his eyes are opened to the fact that there are people who care, who are trying to fight the good fight, and he becomes one of them."

Appearances

Television

Star Wars Rebels
Ezra made his debut appearance on television in the short film "Property of Ezra Bridger", set before the two-part series premiere "Spark of Rebellion". Ezra first encounters a group of Rebels home to the Ghost starship by interfering in their operation. Kanan Jarrus, a Jedi and leader of the group, discovers Ezra's Force-sensitivity. Seeing potential in Ezra, Kanan decides to train him in the ways of the Force. Ezra soon joins the Ghost crew and begins his Jedi training.

In "Path of the Jedi", Ezra is formally inducted into the Jedi Order, when Yoda's voice helps him to find a kyber crystal to create his first lightsaber, which after being constructed, is blue and features a built-in stun blaster patterned after his street urchin trademark weapon, an energy slingshot. In the second-season episode "Legacy", he discovers that his parents were killed in a prison revolt. In "Shroud of Darkness" it is revealed Kanan fears Ezra might turn to the dark side, which partially happens when the former Sith Lord Maul draws him closer in "Twilight of the Apprentice", and in further episodes also keeps calling him "apprentice", showing a marked interest in him. His first lightsaber is also destroyed by Darth Vader. In the season 3 premiere episode "Steps into Shadow", Ezra replaces it with a green-bladed lightsaber. In the same episode, Ezra is promoted to the rank of Lieutenant Commander of the Phoenix Squadron, and also assumes field leadership of the Ghost crew, due to Kanan's blindness preventing him from continuing the role. However, due to his reckless leadership at the time, he was suspended from command as Lieutenant Commander until further notice. The episodes "Shroud of Darkness", "Holocrons of Fate" and "Twin Suns" reveal Ezra's main motivation of the third season, to "find the key to destroying the Sith", who he interprets as the exiled Jedi Master Obi-Wan Kenobi. After eventually finding and talking to Kenobi however, Ezra realized his true mission is to be with the other rebels and help them fight against the Empire. During the season 3 finale, by taking command of a squad during the battle against Grand Admiral Thrawn's fleet, it shows that at this point, Ezra's status as Lieutenant Commander has been fully restored.

Ezra becomes somewhat lost after the death of his master Kanan, but begins to understand Kanan's final lessons after he penetrates the Jedi Temple in "A World Between Worlds". His connection to the Force-sensitive creatures of Lothal increases, and in the penultimate episode "A Fool's Hope" and the one-hour series finale "Family Reunion and Farewell" (both of which aired March 5, 2018), Ezra summons both the Loth-Wolves and the Purrgil to defeat Thrawn, Pryce, and the Imperial forces on Lothal. Because the Purrgil have shattered the bridge observation ports on Thrawn's Star Destroyer, onto which he has been taken, Ezra uses the Force to create a protecting air pocket for himself and Thrawn, and deliberately and selflessly allows himself to be taken away with Thrawn by the Purrgil.

Forces of Destiny
Ezra appears in the Star Wars Forces of Destiny episode "A Disarming Lesson", in which Ahsoka Tano provides Ezra a lesson in finding his inner strength and trusting in the Force.

Ahsoka
Ezra will be making his live action debut in the upcoming series Ahsoka with Eman Esfandi portraying him.

Novels
On August 5, 2014, Del Rey Books published Star Wars: Ezra's Gamble, a prequel novel to the Rebels short film "Property of Ezra Bridger".

Video games
Bridger, as he appeared in the first half of the series, appears in the following video games:
As a playable character in the tower defense mobile game Star Wars: Galactic Defense
As a playable character in the run and gun game Star Wars Rebels: Recon Missions
As a playable character in the toys-to-life game Disney Infinity 3.0, sold as a standalone NFC figure
As a bonus playable character in Lego Star Wars: The Force Awakens, available in the Star Wars Rebels character pack sold as downloadable content
As a playable character in Angry Birds Star Wars II, in which he is represented by the bird Red in its Rebels level set
As a bonus playable character in Lego Star Wars: The Skywalker Saga, available in the Star Wars Rebels character pack sold as downloadable content

Bridger, as he appeared in the second half of the series, appears in the following video games:
As a playable character in the turn-based mobile role-playing game Star Wars: Galaxy of Heroes, classified as an attacker that frequently attacks out of turn and dispels buffs
As a playable squad leader in the mobile MOBA game Star Wars: Force Arena

Lego

Lego Star Wars: Droid Tales
Ezra appears in the Lego Star Wars: Droid Tales episode "Mission to Mos Eisley", which adapts his role in the Rebels first-season episode "Droids in Distress". He is voiced by Adrian Petriw.

Relationships

Mentorship tree

Merchandise
A Funko Pop figurine of Ezra Bridger was announced on September 27, 2016. The Black Series produced a 6-inch figure of Ezra Bridger as a part of a Star Wars and The Mandalorian line.

Critical reception
Ezra Bridger has received generally positive feedback from fans and reviewers. Screen Rant ranked him seventh on a list of the best characters from Star Wars Rebels, saying "his arc across the four seasons is fantastic, and he truly grows and matures into a great character" as well as praising his "beautifully completed [series] personal arc" following the conclusion of the fourth season. Comic Book Resources writer Ian Goodwillie praised the character for his second season depiction as "a character [who] had pointed out the inherent reality of the Clone Wars", comparing him to Darth Maul and praising his mentorship with Hondo Ohnaka, while Kelsey Yoor complimated the characters' utilization of "the archetypal teachings of Joseph Campbell, particularly regarding The Hero's Journey. Collider praised Ezra's relationship with Grand Admiral Thrawn and "fitting" conclusion to their character arc, while Dork Side of the Force praised him as "one of the best characters in the entire story universe" of Star Wars canon.

References

Further reading

External links
 
 

Fictional space pilots
Television characters introduced in 2014
Fictional child soldiers
Fictional commanders
Fictional con artists
Fictional outlaws
Fictional revolutionaries
Fictional spymasters
Fictional thieves
Fictional war veterans
Male characters in animated series
Star Wars animated characters
Star Wars Jedi characters
Star Wars Rebels characters
Animated characters introduced in 2014